Purdue Pharma L.P., formerly the Purdue Frederick Company, is an American privately held pharmaceutical company founded by John Purdue Gray. It was owned principally by members of the Sackler family as descendants of Mortimer and Raymond Sackler. In 2007, it paid out one of the largest fines ever levied against a pharmaceutical firm for misleading the public about how addictive the drug OxyContin was compared to other pain medications. Although the company shifted its focus to abuse-deterrent formulations, Purdue continued to market and sell opioids as late as 2019 and continued to be involved in lawsuits around the opioid epidemic in the United States. Purdue filed for Chapter 11 bankruptcy protection on September 15, 2019, in New York City.

On October 21, 2020, it was reported that Purdue had reached a settlement potentially worth US$8.3 billion, admitting that it "knowingly and intentionally conspired and agreed with others to aid and abet" doctors dispensing medication "without a legitimate medical purpose." Members of the Sackler family will additionally pay US$225 million and the company will close. Some state attorneys general protested the plan. In March 2021, the United States House of Representatives introduced a bill that would stop the bankruptcy judge in the case from granting members of the Sackler family legal immunity during the bankruptcy proceedings. In September 2021, Purdue Pharma announced that it would rebrand itself as Knoa Pharma.

History
The company that became Purdue Pharma was founded in 1892 by medical doctors John Purdue Gray and George Frederick Bingham in New York City as the Purdue Frederick Company. The company made a tonic compound made with sherry and glycerin. Sixty years later, in 1952, the company was sold to two other medical doctors, brothers Raymond and Mortimer Sackler, who relocated the business to Yonkers, New York. The Sacklers' older brother, Arthur Sackler, held a one-third option in the company, which was sold to his brothers after his death. Under the Sacklers, the company opened additional offices in New Jersey and Connecticut. The headquarters are located in Stamford, Connecticut.

The present-day company, Purdue Pharma L.P., was incorporated in 1991 and focused on pain management medication, calling itself a "pioneer in developing medications for reducing pain, a principal cause of human suffering". In September 2015, the company's website said it had some 1,700 people on its payroll. That same month, the company announced it would acquire VM Pharma in the process gaining access to worldwide development and commercial rights to an allosteric selective tropomyosin receptor kinase inhibitor program, i.e., the Phase II candidate VM-902A. The deal could have generated more than US$213 million for VM Pharma.

The company has never had an affiliation with Purdue University, a clarification that the university has made clear, in order to avoid association.

Structure
The company's branches include Purdue Pharma L.P., The Purdue Frederick Company, Purdue Pharmaceutical Products L.P., and Purdue Products L.P.
Its manufacturing takes place at three sites: Purdue Pharmaceuticals L.P., a plant located in Wilson, North Carolina, the P.F. Laboratories, Inc. in Totowa, New Jersey, and Rhodes Technologies L.P., in Coventry, Rhode Island. Purdue Pharma L.P. also has research labs in Cranbury, New Jersey. OxyContin is currently distributed throughout the U.S., Canada, and Mexico. Distribution takes place from the P.F. Laboratories in Totowa, New Jersey.

Rhodes Pharmaceuticals is a sister company that was established in Rhode Island in 2007. The company is one of the largest producers of off-patent generic opioids in the US.

Sister companies to Purdue that are also controlled by descendants of the Sackler brothers are Napp Pharmaceuticals in the United Kingdom and Mundipharma that are selling opioids globally.

New drugs are being developed under other company names, such as Adlon Therapeutics and Imbrium. Both are based in the same building as their parent company in downtown Stamford and share employees.

Management
Craig Landau was appointed CEO on June 22, 2017. He joined Purdue Pharma L.P. in 1999 and was chief medical officer and as vice president of R&D innovation, clinical and medical affairs. In 2013, he was appointed president and CEO of Purdue Pharma (Canada).

By 2018, eight members of the Sackler family were listed to be active or former members of the board of directors. By early 2019, the Sacklers had left the Purdue Pharma board, leaving none on the panel. Steve Miller became chairman in July 2018 with a board of five members left.

Controversy
Purdue Pharma manufactures pain medicines such as hydromorphone, oxycodone, fentanyl, codeine, and hydrocodone. It makes drugs such as MS Contin, OxyContin, and Ryzolt. In 1972, Contin (a controlled drug-release system) was developed. In 1984, its extended-release formulation of morphine, MS Contin was released. After 1995 Food and Drug Administration approval under the auspices of Curtis Wright, its extended-release formulation of oxycodone, OxyContin was released in 1996. Around the time of OxyContin's release, American Pain Society introduced its "pain as fifth vital sign" campaign. Veterans Health Administration adopted the campaign as their national pain management strategy.

The controversy behind the company emerged as a result of the drugs that they made and how they carried high potential for addiction. The most commonly abused medications that the company produces are MS Contin and OxyContin. Both can be abused by crushing, chewing, snorting, or injecting the dissolved product. These ingestion methods create a significant risk to the abuser; they can result in overdose and death. Drug-seeking tactics that addicts undergo to obtain the medication include "doctor shopping", which is visiting a number of different physicians to obtain additional prescriptions and refusal to follow up with appropriate examinations. Along with the high potential for abuse among people without prescriptions, there is also a risk for physical dependency and reduced reaction or drug desensitization for patients that are prescribed them. Nevertheless, strong analgesic drugs remain indispensable to patients with severe acute and cancer pain.

OxyContin, introduced in 1995, was Purdue Pharma's breakthrough palliative for chronic pain. Under a marketing strategy that Arthur Sackler had pioneered decades earlier, the company aggressively pressed doctors to prescribe the drug, wooing them with free trips to pain-management seminars (which were effectively all-expenses-paid vacations) and paid speaking engagements. Sales soared. The drug was marketed as "smooth and sustained pain control all day and all night" when taken on a 12-hour schedule and as having lower abuse potential than immediate-release oxycodone because of its time-release properties, even though there was no scientific evidence backing that conclusion and the addictive nature of opiates had been known for thousands of years. In these early years, Purdue Pharma was aware of OxyContin abuse, including "reports that the pills were being crushed and snorted; stolen from pharmacies; and that some doctors were being charged with selling prescriptions," according to The New York Times, based on a confidential Justice Department report that was revealed in May 2018. Over a hundred internal company memos between 1997 and 1999 included the words "street value," "crush," or "snort."

At the start of 2000, reports of OxyContin abuse surfaced. The results obtained from a proactive abuse surveillance program called Researched Abused, Diversion, and Addiction-Related Surveillance (RADARS) sponsored by Purdue Pharma L.P. pronounced Oxycontin and hydrocodone the most commonly abused pain medications. In 2012, The New England Journal of Medicine published a study that found that "76 percent of those seeking help for heroin addiction began by abusing pharmaceutical narcotics, primarily OxyContin" and drew a direct line between Purdue's marketing of OxyContin and the subsequent heroin epidemic in the U.S.

In 2003, the Drug Enforcement Administration found that Purdue's "aggressive methods" had "very much exacerbated OxyContin's widespread abuse."

A 2016 investigation by the Los Angeles Times reported that in many people OxyContin's 12-hour schedule does not adequately control pain, resulting in withdrawal symptoms including intense craving for the drug. The journalists suggested that this problem gives "new insight into why so many people have become addicted." Using Purdue documents and other records, they claim that Purdue was aware of this problem even before the drug went to market but "held fast to the claim of 12-hour relief, in part to protect its revenue [because] OxyContin's market dominance and its high price—up to hundreds of dollars per bottle—hinge on its 12-hour duration."

OxyContin became a blockbuster drug. "Between 1995 and 2001, OxyContin brought in $2.8 billion in revenue for Purdue Pharma." Cumulative revenues had increased to US$31 billion by 2016 and US$35 billion by 2017. According to a 2017 article in The New Yorker, Purdue Pharma is "owned by one of America's richest families, with a collective net worth of thirteen billion dollars". Many US states allege the family is worth more than $13 billion. In response to this and other journalism, photographer Nan Goldin launched the organization P.A.I.N., to pressure museums and other cultural institutions to divest from Sackler Family philanthropy.

In 2018, Purdue Pharma patented a new form of buprenorphine which controls cravings and is used to treat addiction to opioids such as OxyContin. In the same 2018, Ryan Hampton organized a protest against the pharmaceutical company for their role in the opioid crisis that spilled from the courtrooms into the streets.

Oxycontin-related lawsuits
Purdue has been involved in measures against prescription drug abuse, particularly of Oxycontin, an often-abused prescription drug which is among the drugs most commonly cited in connection with overdose deaths.

Connecticut
In 2001, Connecticut Attorney General Richard Blumenthal issued a statement urging Purdue to take action regarding abuse of Oxycontin. He observed that while Purdue seemed sincere, there was little action being taken beyond "cosmetic and symbolic steps." After Purdue announced plans to reformulate the drug, Blumenthal noted that this would take time and that "Purdue Pharma has a moral, if not legal obligation to take effective steps and address addiction and abuse even as it works to reformulate the drug."

West Virginia
In 2004, the West Virginia Attorney General sued Purdue for reimbursement of "excessive prescription costs" paid by the state. Saying that patients were taking more of the drug than they had been prescribed because the effects of the drug wore off hours before the 12-hour schedule, the state charged Purdue with deceptive marketing. In his ruling the trial judge wrote: "Plaintiff's evidence shows Purdue could have tested the safety and efficacy of OxyContin at eight hours, and could have amended their label, but did not." The case never went to trial; Purdue agreed to settle by paying the state (equivalent to approximately $M in ) for programs to discourage drug abuse, with all the evidence remaining under seal and confidential.

2007 guilty plea
In May 2007, the company pleaded guilty to misleading the public about OxyContin's risk of addiction and agreed to pay  (equivalent to approximately $M in ) in one of the largest pharmaceutical settlements in U.S. history. In addition, three top executives were charged with a felony and sentenced to 400 hours of community service in drug treatment programs.

Kentucky
On October 4, 2007, Kentucky officials sued Purdue because of widespread OxyContin abuse in Appalachia. A lawsuit filed by Kentucky then-Attorney General Greg Stumbo and Pike County officials demanded millions in compensation. Eight years later, on December 23, 2015, Kentucky settled with Purdue for $24 million.

City of Everett (Washington state)
In January 2017, the city of Everett, Washington sued Purdue based on increased costs for the city from the use of OxyContin as well as Purdue not intervening when they noted odd patterns of sale of their product, per agreement in the 2007 suit noted above. The allegations say Purdue did not follow legal agreements to track suspicious excess ordering or potential black market usage. The suit says false clinics created by unscrupulous doctors used homeless individuals as 'patients' to purchase OxyContin, then sold it to the citizens of Everett.

The black market sale of the drug out of legal pharmacies based in Los Angeles with distributions points in Everett is also said to be part of the experience of the city according to the suit. No intervention was made by Purdue to contact the DEA for years despite knowing of the practice and the overuse and sale of their product. The suit asks for a yet to be determined reimbursement related to costs of policing, housing, health care, rehabilitation, criminal justice system, park and recreations department, as well as to the loss of life or compromised quality of life of the citizens of Everett directly.

6-state lawsuit
In May 2018, six states—Florida, Nevada, North Carolina, North Dakota, Tennessee and Texas—filed lawsuits charging deceptive marketing practices, adding to 16 previously filed lawsuits by other U.S. states and Puerto Rico. By January 2019, 36 states were suing Purdue Pharma.

Massachusetts

In 2019, Massachusetts attorney general Maura Healey filed a lawsuit against Purdue Pharma which also claimed eight members of the Sackler family were "personally responsible" for deceptive sales practices and in fact had "micromanaged" a "deceptive sales campaign."  In response, the company said there was a “rush to vilify.”

Purdue started the OxyContin "Savings Card" program in 2008, with patients receiving discounts on their first five prescriptions.  Internal company data showed these discounts led to 60 percent more patients staying on OxyContin for longer than 90 days. The court filing for Massachusetts stated, "Purdue determined that opioid savings cards worked like the teaser rate on a long-term and very high-stakes mortgage."

Oklahoma
In March 2019, Purdue Pharma reached a $270m settlement in a lawsuit filed by Oklahoma, which claimed its opioids contributed to the deaths of thousands of people.

2019 and 2020 lawsuits and negotiations toward public benefits company
In August 2019, Purdue Pharma and the Sackler family were in negotiations to settle the claims for a payment of $10-$12 billion.
 The settlement would include a Chapter 11 filing by Purdue Pharma, which would be restructured as public beneficiary trust and the Sackler Family would give up any ownership in the company. Addiction treatment drugs currently developed by the company would be given to the public cost-free. All profits of Purdue would henceforth go to the plaintiffs in the case. On top of that, the Sackler family would contribute $3 billion in cash. The family would also sell Mundipharma and contribute another $1.5 billion from the sales proceeds to the settlement. However, the Sackler family would remain a billionaire family and would not be criminally charged for contributing to the opioid crisis. In September 2019, the office of the New York Attorney General accused the Sackler family of hiding money by wiring at least $1 billion from company accounts to personal accounts overseas.

In October 2020, Purdue agreed to an $8 billion settlement that includes a $2 billion criminal forfeiture, a $3.54 billion criminal fine, and $2.8 billion in damages for its civil liability. It will plead guilty to three criminal charges, and it will become a public benefit company under a trust that is required to consider American public health. The Sacklers will not be permitted to be involved in the new company.

Potential 2022 bankruptcy settlement with the Sacklers leaving the company
In March 2022, a U.S. bankruptcy judge approved a settlement involving eight states plus the District of Columbia. Part of this settlement will involve the Sacklers leaving the company.  The family will also pay up to $6 billion.  In return, they will be shielded from personal civil liability. However, family members will not be shielded from potential criminal liability.

In early May 2022, a three-judge U.S. appeals court heard arguments on whether Sackler family members should be released from future debt even though they themselves are not filing for bankruptcy.  Called "non-debtor release," this has been a source of controversy within the legal profession.  An attorney for Purdue Pharma argued that this is necessary for the $6 billion settlement to work and that non-debtor release is not directly prohibited by U.S. bankruptcy law.  Whereas an attorney for the Office of the U.S. Trustee argued that bankruptcy judges should not go beyond their assigned job of bankrupt corporations and persons.

Bankruptcy 
In mid-September 2019, Purdue filed for bankruptcy in White Plains, New York, a few days after reaching a tentative settlement with state and local governments that were suing the company over the cost of the opioid epidemic.

Many states refused the terms of the proposed August 2019 settlement and vowed to pursue further litigation to recover additional money, much of it alleged to be hidden offshore. The states contend the Sacklers knew litigants would be pursuing Purdue's funds and committed fraudulent conveyance. Whether or not a state had chosen to settle mostly fell along party lines, with Republican-led states choosing to settle. Most of the wealth of the Sackler Family is not held in Purdue. States are seeking to hold individual family members personally liable for the costs of the opioid epidemic, regardless of Purdue's bankruptcy.

A December 2019 audit from AlixPartners, hired by Purdue for guidance through Chapter 11 restructuring, said the Sacklers withdrew $10.7 billion from Purdue after the company began to receive legal scrutiny. In 2021, the Sacklers sought a controversial non-consensual third-party release in the authority of judge Robert D. Drain as to protect them and their assets from lawsuits linked to the opioid crisis. In reaction to this, US Representatives Carolyn Maloney and Mark DeSaulnier introduced a SACKLER Act as to prevent people who have not filed for bankruptcy from being released from lawsuits brought by states, municipalities or the U.S. government.

In September 2021, the company won approval of a $4.5 billion (US) plan that will legally dissolve the pharmaceutical manufacturer and restructure it into a public benefit corporation focused on addressing the opioid crisis and repaying individuals and families who were damaged by its products. This restructuring will be financed by a settlement with the Sackler family, insurance payments and ongoing business operations. The settlement expunges all creditor claims against the Sacklers (who are not in bankruptcy) through a legal device, third-party releases, which eliminates the family's exposure to civil litigation over opioid addiction. This settlement would be overturned in December 2021 by Judge Colleen McMahon of the U.S. District Court for the Southern District of New York, as bankruptcy code did not permit a judge to release the Sacklers from civil liability. Congress continues to discuss statutory restrictions on the releases.

In early March 2022, members of the Sackler family that own Purdue Pharma struck a new settlement with a group of eight states and the District of Columbia to resolve the litigation. Under the terms of the new settlement agreement, which remains subject to review and approval from an appeals court and bankruptcy court confirmation, the Sacklers will pay between $5.5 and $6 billion to a trust that will be used to pay the claims of opioid creditors, including states, victims of addiction, hospitals, and municipalities.

See also
 Richard Sackler, former chairman and president of Purdue Pharma
 Timeline of the opioid epidemic
 The Crime of the Century, two-part documentary
 Empire of Pain, book by Patrick Radden Keefe.
 Dopesick: Dealers, Doctors, and the Drug Company That Addicted America, book by Beth Macy
 Dopesick, Hulu TV drama
 The Pharmacist, Netflix documentary series

References

Further reading

External links

 
 Washington Post July 20, 2019 "An onslaught of pills, hundreds of thousands of deaths: Who is accountable?"
 "The Pharmacist", a Netflix documentary series about the role a Louisiana pharmacist played in exposing corruption behind the opioid addiction crisis.

Pharmaceutical companies of the United States
Companies based in Stamford, Connecticut
Drug policy of the United States
Sackler family
Health care companies based in Connecticut
Privately held companies based in Connecticut
Social problems in medicine
Corruption in the United States
American companies established in 1892
1892 establishments in New York (state)
Opioid epidemic
Companies that filed for Chapter 11 bankruptcy in 2019
Organized crime in the United States